The Cumberland Covered Bridge, also known as the Matthews Covered Bridge, is a historic covered bridge spanning the Mississinewa River at Jefferson Township and Matthews, Grant County, Indiana. It was originally called the New Cumberland Covered Bridge, it was built in 1877 by William Parks of Marion, Indiana. It is the only remaining covered bridge in Grant County.

It was listed on the National Register of Historic Places in 1978.

Floods
It was returned upstream on rollers dragged by horses. The foundations were raised an additional  at that time. The 1958 flood only loosened a few boards.

See also
List of bridges documented by the Historic American Engineering Record in Indiana

References

External links

National Register of Historic Places in Grant County, Indiana
Covered bridges on the National Register of Historic Places in Indiana
Bridges completed in 1877
Historic American Engineering Record in Indiana
Transportation buildings and structures in Grant County, Indiana
Tourist attractions in Grant County, Indiana
Howe truss bridges in the United States
Road bridges on the National Register of Historic Places in Indiana
Wooden bridges in Indiana
1877 establishments in Indiana